Warren William Kilbourne (June 20, 1916 – May 16, 1967) was a player in the National Football League.

Biography
Kilbourne was born on June 20, 1916 in Saint Paul, Minnesota. He played with the Green Bay Packers during the 1939 NFL season. As such, he was a member of the 1939 NFL Champion Packers.

He played at the collegiate level at the University of Minnesota.

See also
List of Green Bay Packers players

References

1916 births
1967 deaths
Players of American football from Saint Paul, Minnesota
Green Bay Packers players
University of Minnesota alumni
Minnesota Golden Gophers football players